Fuk Wa Street is a street in Cheung Sha Wan and Sham Shui Po, New Kowloon, Hong Kong.

Name
Unlike other streets in the area, Fuk Wa Street is not named after a place in China. Its name means blessing (fuk, 福) and prosperous (wa, 華) while its brother street Fuk Wing Street glorious, prosperous (wing, 榮). Upon creation, it was named Om Yau Street (菴由街), but was later changed.

Retail
Part of the street from Nam Cheong Street to Kweilin Street is a street market from 12 noon until 9 pm, with numerous stalls selling varieties of goods like old books and clothes. The Golden Computer Arcade is located in its section between Yen Chow Street and Kweilin Street. The section of the road due south of Nam Cheong Street is notorious for being the red-light district of Sham Shui Po.

Features
Fuk Wa Street spans from Castle Peak Road to Tai Po Road. It is divided into several sections, interrupted by various building structures.
 A covered nullah on Nam Cheong Street
 Schools including Kowloon Technical School, Cheung Sha Wan Factory Estate, Un Chau Estate and Cheung Sha Wan Catholic School, between Camp Street and Cheung Wah Street

See also

 List of streets and roads in Hong Kong

References

Roads in New Kowloon
Cheung Sha Wan
Sham Shui Po
Street markets in Hong Kong
Red-light districts in Hong Kong